Nong Lom railway station is a railway station located in Si Bua Ban Subdistrict, Lamphun City, Lamphun.

Train services 
 Local 407/408 Nakhon Sawan-Chiang Mai-Nakhon Sawan

References 
 
 

Railway stations in Thailand